Thierry Laurent is a French art critic. He was born in 1959. He has worked variously as an auctioneer, art critic, and teacher. He has written a series of books on contemporary art, notably one about the French artist Daniel Buren titled Mots clefs pour Daniel Buren . His first novel Mordre appeared in 2007.

References

French writers
1959 births
Living people
Date of birth missing (living people)